Download Series Volume 11 is a live album by the rock band the Grateful Dead. It was released as a three-disc digital download on March 7, 2006.  It contains the complete show the band performed on June 20, 1991 at the Pine Knob Music Theatre in Clarkston, Michigan. The first and third disc are supplemented by songs from the previous night at the same venue.

Track listing
Disc one
First set:
 "Touch of Grey" > (Garcia, Hunter) – 6:39
 "Greatest Story Ever Told" (Weir, Hart, Hunter) – 4:44
 "Peggy-O" (Trad. Arr. By Grateful Dead) – 7:47
 "Mexicali Blues" > (Weir, Barlow) – 5:51
 "Maggie's Farm" (Dylan) – 8:26
 "Bird Song" (Garcia, Hunter) – 14:21
June 19, 1991 bonus tracks:
 "Scarlet Begonias" > (Garcia, Hunter) – 14:16
 "Fire on the Mountain" (Hart, Hunter) – 13:36
Disc two
Second set:
 "Throwing Stones" > (Weir, Barlow) – 6:52
 "Iko Iko" (Crawford, B. Hawkins, R. Hawkins, Johnson) – 9:51
 "All Along the Watchtower" > (Dylan) – 7:40
 "Standing on the Moon" > (Garcia, Hunter) – 10:36
 "He's Gone" > (Garcia, Hunter) – 10:07
 "Rhythm Devils" > (Hart, Kreutzmann) – 20:30
 "Space" > (Garcia, Lesh, Weir) – 9:37
Disc three
 "The Wheel" > (Garcia, Hunter) – 5:10
 "I Need a Miracle" > (Weir, Barlow) – 5:04
 "Wharf Rat" > (Garcia, Hunter) – 10:40
 "Throwing Stones" > (Weir, Barlow) – 4:42
 "Not Fade Away" (Petty, Hardin) – 11:02
Encore:
"Brokedown Palace" (Garcia, Hunter) – 5:08
June 19, 1991 bonus tracks:
"Stella Blue" > (Garcia, Hunter) – 10:08
 "The Other One" > (Weir, Kreutzmann) – 7:51
 "Johnny B. Goode" (Berry) – 4:52

Personnel
Grateful Dead
Jerry Garcia – lead guitar, vocals
Mickey Hart – drums, percussion 
Bruce Hornsby – piano, accordion, vocals
Bill Kreutzmann – drums, percussion
Phil Lesh – electric bass 
Bob Weir – rhythm guitar, vocals 
Vince Welnick – keyboards, vocals

References

11
2006 live albums